Aitovo (Ayıt) is a rural locality (a village) in Urshakbashkaramalinsky Selsoviet, Miyakinsky District, Bashkortostan, Russia. The population was 121 as of 2010. There are 2 streets.

Geography 
Aitovo is located 45 km northeast of Kirgiz-Miyaki (the district's administrative centre) by road. Chishmy is the nearest rural locality.

References 

Rural localities in Miyakinsky District